Marked Tree School District 28  is a school district based in Marked Tree, Poinsett County, Arkansas, United States. The school district provides early childhood, elementary and secondary education for more than 650 students in prekindergarten through grade 12 and employs more than 100 educators and staff for its three schools and district offices.

The school district encompasses  of land in Poinsett County and supports Marked Tree, Trumann and Tyronza.

History 
Before 1901, the only public school for the children of Marked Tree was about one mile out of town in a building called Woodman Hall. In 1901, the first public school within Marked Tree began. A new building was built in 1906, and in 1914, a three-story brick building was built to house the school. In 1914, the high school began; it was remodeled in the summer of 1949. A new elementary school was built in 1937. It later became the middle school but burned down in 1978. A new elementary school was built in 1957.

In September 1938, a George Washington Carver School was started for black children. It had six classrooms. The schools were desegregated in 1965 with the enrollment of 6 African American children in the public school system.  The names of the six children were King Solomon Johnson, Carl Lynn Johnson, Cleodis Lee Bradley, Florence Bradley, Chaundra Grant and Deborah Nix

Schools 
The school district consists of the following schools:

 Marked Tree Elementary School, serving prekindergarten through grade 5.
 Marked Tree Middle School, serving grades 6 through 8.
 Marked Tree High School, serving grades 9 through 12.

Marked Tree School District is one of several school districts affiliated with the Crowley's Ridge Education Service Cooperative.

References

External links
 

Education in Poinsett County, Arkansas
School districts in Arkansas
1901 establishments in Arkansas
School districts established in 1901